Kingwater is a civil parish in the Carlisle district of Cumbria, England.  It contains six listed buildings that are recorded in the National Heritage List for England.  All the listed buildings are designated at Grade II, the lowest of the three grades, which is applied to "buildings of national importance and special interest".  The parish is almost entirely rural and its listed buildings consist of farmhouses and farm buildings, a house, and a former corn mill.  The parish also contains the base of RAF Spadeadam where part of a Blue Streak rocket is preserved.


Buildings

References

Citations

Sources

Lists of listed buildings in Cumbria